Persatuan Sepakbola Lambhuk 1948 (simply known as PS Lambhuk 1948) is an Indonesian football club based in Banda Aceh, Aceh. They currently compete in the Liga 3.

History
PS Lambhuk was founded in 1948 by the community leaders of Gampong Lambhuk, namely, Ramli, H.M. Dehan Yazid, Juned and several other Lambhuk community leaders.

References

External links

Banda Aceh
Football clubs in Indonesia
Football clubs in Aceh
Association football clubs established in 1948
1948 establishments in Indonesia